{{Taxobox
| image = Savanna pathfinder skipper (Pardaleodes incerta incerta).jpg
| image_caption = 'Pardaleodes incerta incertaKibale Forest, Uganda
| regnum = Animalia
| phylum = Arthropoda
| classis = Insecta
| ordo = Lepidoptera
| familia = Hesperiidae
| genus = Pardaleodes| species = P. incerta| binomial = Pardaleodes incerta| binomial_authority = (Snellen, 1872)
| synonyms =Pamphila incerta Snellen, 1872Hesperia murcia Plötz, 1883Pardaleodes oedipus var. diluta Robbe, 1892
}}Pardaleodes incerta, the savanna pathfinder skipper, is a butterfly in the family Hesperiidae. It is found in Senegal, Guinea-Bissau, Guinea, Burkina Faso, Sierra Leone, Ivory Coast, Ghana, Togo, Nigeria, Cameroon, Gabon, the Republic of the Congo, Angola, the Democratic Republic of the Congo, Sudan, Uganda, Kenya, Tanzania and Zambia. The habitat consists of the transition zone between forests and savanna and riverine forests.

Adults of both sexes are attracted to flowers.

The larvae feed on Imperata cylindrica.

SubspeciesPardaleodes incerta incerta (Angola, Democratic Republic of the Congo, southern Sudan, Uganda, Kenya, Tanzania, north-western and north-eastern Zambia)Pardaleodes incerta murcia'' (Plötz, 1883) (Senegal, Guinea-Bissau, Guinea, Burkina Faso, Sierra Leone, Ivory Coast, Ghana, Togo, Nigeria, Cameroon, Gabon, Congo)

References

Butterflies described in 1872
Erionotini
Taxa named by Pieter Cornelius Tobias Snellen
Butterflies of Africa